Robert Jackson (born 5 June 1934) is an English former professional footballer who played as a right back.

Career
Born in Middleton, Jackson played for Oldham Athletic, Lincoln City and Wisbech Town.

References

1934 births
Living people
English footballers
Oldham Athletic A.F.C. players
Lincoln City F.C. players
Wisbech Town F.C. players
English Football League players
Association football fullbacks